Songs from the Heart may refer to:

 Songs from the Heart (Celtic Woman album), a 2010 album by the group Celtic Woman
 Songs from the Heart (compilation album), a 1998 various artists compilation
 Songs from the Heart (George Jones album), 1962
 Songs from the Heart (Johnny Hartman album), 1955
 Songs from the Heart (Mark Vincent album), 2012
 Songs from the Heart (Rick Price album), 1996
 Songs from the Heart (Yanni album), 1999
 Songs from the Heart (Yolanda Adams album), 1998
 Songs from the Heart (Sandi Patty album), 1984